Brandeis/Roberts is an MBTA Commuter Rail station in Waltham, Massachusetts. It serves the Fitchburg Line and is located on the edge of the campus of Brandeis University. The station is fully accessible, with mini-high platforms serving both tracks.

History
The Fitchburg Railroad opened from Waltham to Concord on June 17, 1844; however, Roberts station (named for the adjacent neighborhood) was not opened until around 1870. The Boston and Maine Railroad (B&M) closed the station building in 1937, but trains continued to stop at the platform.

In 1977 or 1978, the station was renamed Brandeis–Roberts (later styled Brandeis/Roberts) to denote the growing university. A $70,000 renovation of the station was completed on December 18, 1986. Accessible mini-high platforms were installed either in that renovation or around 1991.

References

External links

MBTA – Brandeis/Roberts
Station from Google Maps Street View

MBTA Commuter Rail stations in Middlesex County, Massachusetts
Railway stations in Massachusetts at university and college campuses